Agnippe novisyrictis is a moth of the family Gelechiidae. It is found in China (Gansu, Hebei, Henan, Shaanxi) and Russia (Primorsky Region).

The wingspan is 8–9 mm. The forewings are grey-brown, the posterior margin grey-cream, densely mottled brown. The hindwings are light grey. Adults are on wing from July to August.

References

Moths described in 1993
Agnippe
Moths of Asia